William Ernest Beck was an Anglican priest in the 20th century. He was born on 4 October 1884, educated at Great Yarmouth Grammar School and Durham University and ordained in 1908. From then to 1915 he was a tutor then vice-principal at St Aidan's Theological College, Birkenhead. After this he was Vicar of St Anne's Birkenhead before 28 years as the principal of St Paul's Training College, Cheltenham. In 1949 he was appointed Dean of Worcester, a position he held to his death on 22 May 1957.

References

1884 births
People educated at Great Yarmouth Grammar School
Alumni of University College, Durham
Deans of Worcester
1957 deaths